Simeon Šutev (born 21 November 1942) is a Yugoslav wrestler. He competed in the men's freestyle 57 kg at the 1968 Summer Olympics.

References

1942 births
Living people
Yugoslav male sport wrestlers
Olympic wrestlers of Yugoslavia
Wrestlers at the 1968 Summer Olympics
Sportspeople from Štip